Robert E. Brannan (November 12, 1891 – August 6, 1958) was an American football, basketball, and baseball player and coach. He was the first coach in Chicago Bears franchise history, running the team when they were known as the Decatur Staleys in 1919.

In 1920, he became the ninth head football coach at  Ottawa University in Ottawa, Kansas, a position he held for three seasons until 1922.  His coaching record at Ottawa was 4–19–1. According to football legend Walter Camp, the only bright spot for the team in the 1922 season was a guard named Swineheart who "played consistently" for the season.
Brannan graduated from the Ottawa academy in 1911. He later graduated from Ottawa University in 1915, having earned fourteen letters in all university sports. Prior to coaching at Ottawa, he has coached at Sioux Falls University, James Millikin University and at high schools near Decatur, Illinois. After coaching he worked for what later became Union Carbide, Co. until he retired in 1956. He died at a hospital at New York City in 1958.

Head coaching record

College football

References

1891 births
1958 deaths
Millikin Big Blue baseball coaches
Millikin Big Blue football coaches
Chicago Bears head coaches
Millikin Big Blue men's basketball coaches
Ottawa Braves baseball coaches
Ottawa Braves baseball players
Ottawa Braves football coaches
Ottawa Braves football players
Ottawa Braves basketball coaches
Ottawa Braves basketball players
People from Rush County, Kansas
American men's basketball players
Basketball coaches from Kansas
Basketball players from Kansas
Baseball coaches from Kansas
Baseball players from Kansas
Coaches of American football from Kansas
Players of American football from Kansas